Tillandsia schiedeana is a species of flowering plant in the genus Tillandsia. It was named for the collector Christian Julius Wilhelm Schiede.  As an epiphyte it is found "growing in open tropical forests, and saxicolous, growing on cacti and burseras on steep dry slopes in semiarid regions in Mexico, Central America, West Indies, Venezuela, and Colombia at elevations of 750 to 5,500 feet."

Description
This bromeliad tends to be very variable in form; it is characterized by large but thin stiff leaves.  In bloom it forms an inflorescence approximately 40 cm high with yellow or reddish-yellow flowers.  It is lightly scaled, prefers full sun, and grows in mounds.

Cultivars
 Tillandsia 'Bruce Aldridge'
 Tillandsia 'Candela'
 Tillandsia 'Jack Staub'
 Tillandsia 'Laurie'
 Tillandsia 'Little Star'
 Tillandsia 'Peltry Jellyfish'
 Tillandsia 'Pixie'
 Tillandsia 'Starburst'
 Tillandsia 'Tiki Torch'
 Tillandsia 'Tooshi'

References

schiedeana
Flora of Central America
Flora of Mexico
Flora of the Caribbean
Epiphytes
Flora of South America
Plants described in 1831
Flora without expected TNC conservation status